Devergie is a French surname. Notable people with the surname include:

Marie-Guillaume-Alphonse Devergie (1798–1879), French dermatologist
Martin Devergie (born 1995), French rugby union footballer
Thierry Devergie (born 1966), French rugby union footballer

French-language surnames